Aarhus Idrætsforening af 1900 commonly known as Århus 1900 is a Danish sports club from Århus in Denmark. It has sections for athletics, badminton, orienteering, swimming, triathlon, tennis, volley and football.

The club is one of Denmark's biggest, and a number of athletes has participated in the Summer Olympic Games, World Championships and European Athletics Championships.

Most famous is perhaps shot putter Joachim Olsen, but also Christina Scherwin and Renata Nielsen has represented the club.

The club's long-time rival is AGF-Athletics

The club arranges the annual track and field event, Århus Games

External links
 Official site 

Athletics clubs in Denmark
Multi-sport clubs in Denmark
Sports clubs established in 1900
Sports teams in Denmark
1900 establishments in Denmark